Gymnelia dubia is a moth of the subfamily Arctiinae. It was described by Rothschild in 1911. It is found on Jamaica.

References

 Natural History Museum Lepidoptera generic names catalog

Gymnelia
Moths described in 1911